Tron is a district (amphoe) of Uttaradit province, northern Thailand.

Geography
Neighboring districts are (from the north clockwise) Laplae, Mueang Uttaradit, Thong Saen Khan, Phichai, of Uttaradit Province, Si Nakhon and Si Satchanalai of Sukhothai province

Administration
The district is divided into five sub-districts (tambons), which are further subdivided into 47 villages (mubans). There are two sub-district municipalities (thesaban tambon): Tron covers parts of tambon Wang Daeng, and Ban Kaeng covers parts of the same-named tambon. There are a further five tambon administrative organizations (TAO).

References

External links
amphoe.com (Thai)

Tron